This is a list of notable German-language comedians.

 Alfons (born 1967)
 Enissa Amani (born 1981)
 Ingo Appelt (born 1967)
 Eddi Arent (1925-2013)
 Fips Asmussen (1938-2020)
 Django Asül (born 1972)
 Dirk Bach (1961–2012)
 Hugo Egon Balder (born 1950)
 Badesalz
 Mario Barth (born 1972)
 Frank-Markus Barwasser (born 1960)
 Jürgen Becker (born 1959)
 Hennes Bender (born 1968)
 Ilka Bessin (born 1971)
 Mirja Boes (born 1971)
 Wigald Boning (born 1967)
 Elmar Brandt (born 1971)
 Vicco von Bülow (1923-2011)
 Jochen Busse (born 1941)
 Bülent Ceylan (born 1976)
 Özcan Coşar (born 1981)
 Eberhard Cohrs (1921-1999)
 Karl Dall (1941–2020)
 Olli Dittrich (born 1956)
 Alfred Dorfer (born 1961)
 Sammy Drechsel (1925-1985)
 Klaus-Jürgen Deuser (born 1962)
 Gerd Dudenhöffer (born 1949)
 Christian Ehring (born 1972)
 Anke Engelke (born 1965)
 Elton (born 1971)
 Heinz Erhardt (1909-1979)
 Helga Feddersen (1930-1990)
 Herbert Feuerstein (1937-2020)
 Werner Finck (1902-1978)
 Ottfried Fischer (born 1953)
 Peter Frankenfeld (1913–1979)
 Annette Frier (born 1974)
 Tom Gerhardt (born 1957)
 Max Giermann (born 1975)
 Simon Gosejohann (born 1976)
 Sascha Grammel (born 1974)
 Monika Gruber (born 1971)
 Dieter Hallervorden (born 1935)
 Evelyn Hamann (1942-2007)
 Klaus Havenstein (1922-1998)
 Michael "Bully" Herbig (born 1968)
 Christoph Maria Herbst (born 1966)
 Thomas Hermanns (born 1963)
 Rolf Herricht (1927-1981)
 Dieter Hildebrandt (1927-2013)
 Martina Hill (born 1974)
 Eckart von Hirschhausen (born 1967)
 Bernhard Hoëcker (born 1970)
 Rüdiger Hoffmann (born 1964)
 Hanns Dieter Hüsch (1925-2005)
 Gerburg Jahnke (born 1955)
 Bruno Jonas (born 1952)
 Harald Juhnke (1929-2005)
 Oliver Kalkofe (born 1965)
 Rick Kavanian (born 1971)
 Carolin Kebekus (born 1980)
 Hape Kerkeling (born 1964)
 Michael Kessler (born 1967)
 Martin Klempnow (born 1973)
 Dennie Klose (born 1979)
 Piet Klocke (born 1957)
  (born 1972)
 Gaby Köster (born 1961)
 Diether Krebs (1947-2000)
 Markus Krebs (born 1970)
 Kurt Krömer (born 1974)
 Mike Krüger (born 1951)
 Sarah Kuttner (born 1979)
 Jürgen von der Lippe (born 1948)
 Felix Lobrecht (born 1988)
 Lore Lorentz (1920-1994)
 Loriot (1923-2011)
 Ingolf Lück (born 1958)
 Uwe Lyko (born 1954)
 Markus Majowski (born 1964)
 Jürgen von Manger (1923-1994)
 Tetje Mierendorf (born 1972)
 Michael Mittermeier (born 1966)
 Luke Mockridge (born 1989)
 Petra Nadolny (born 1960)
 Dieter Nuhr (born 1960)
 Hans Werner Olm (born 1955)
 Anne Onken (born 1977)
 Ingo Oschmann (born 1969)
 Bastian Pastewka (born 1972)
 Volker Pispers (born 1958)
 Oliver Pocher (born 1978)
 Kalle Pohl (born 1951)
 Alf Poier (born 1967)
 Gerhard Polt (born 1942)
 Hans-Joachim Preil (1923-1999)
 Urban Priol (born 1961)
 Markus Maria Profitlich (born 1960)
 Sebastian Pufpaff (born 1976)
 Stefan Raab (born 1966)
 Andreas Rebers (born 1958)
 Lukas Resetarits (born 1947)
 Hagen Rether (born 1969)
 Otto Reutter (1870-1931)
 Mathias Richling (born 1953)
 Beatrice Richter (born 1948)
 Hannes Ringlstetter (born 1970)
 Richard Rogler (born 1949)
 Helmut Ruge (1940-2014)
 Christian Schiffer (born 1985)
 Wilfried Schmickler (born 1954)
 Harald Schmidt (born 1957)
 Ralf Schmitz (born 1974)
 Helge Schneider (born 1955)
 Martin Schneider (born 1964)
 Olaf Schubert (born 1967)
 Georg Schramm (born 1949)
 Atze Schröder (born 1965)
 Esther Schweins (born 1970)
 Christoph Sieber (born 1971)
 Hella von Sinnen (born 1959)
 Hans Söllner (born 1955)
 Martin Sonneborn (born 1965)
 Ingrid Steeger (born 1947)
 Emil Steinberger (born 1933)
 Bernd Stelter (born 1961)
 Wolfgang Stumph (born 1946)
 Cordula Stratmann (born 1963)
 Tahnee (born 1992)
 Chris Tall (born 1991)
 Murat Topal (born 1976)
 Nora Tschirner (born 1981)
 Christian Tramitz (born 1955)
 Karl Valentin (1882-1948)
 Jan van Weyde (born 1979)
 Elisabeth Volkmann (1936-2006)
 Antonia von Romatowski (born 1976)
 Otto Waalkes (born 1948)
 Claus von Wagner (born 1977)
 Lilo Wanders (born 1955)
 Henning Wehn (born 1974)
 Kaya Yanar (born 1973)

See also 

 Cabaret 
 German humour
 List of comedians 
 List of German people

German comedians
Comedians